The 2016 Texas State Bobcats football team represented Texas State University in the 2016 NCAA Division I FBS football season. The Bobcats played their home games at Bobcat Stadium in San Marcos, Texas and competed in the Sun Belt Conference. They were led by first-year head coach Everett Withers. The Bobcats were members of the Sun Belt Conference. They finished the season 2–10, 0–8 in Sun Belt play to finish in last place.

Schedule
Texas State announced its 2016 football schedule on March 3, 2016. The 2016 schedule consists of six home and away games in the regular season. The Bobcats will host Sun Belt foes Arkansas State, Idaho, Louisiana–Lafayette, and Troy, and will travel to Appalachian State, Georgia State, Louisiana–Monroe, and New Mexico State. Texas State will skip out on two Sun Belt teams this season, Georgia Southern and South Alabama.

The team will play four non–conference games, two home games against Houston from the American Athletic Conference (ACC) and Incarnate Word from the Southland Conference, and two road games against Arkansas from the Southeastern Conference (SEC) and Ohio from the Mid-American Conference (MAC).

Schedule source:

Game summaries

at Ohio

at Arkansas

Houston

Incarnate Word

at Georgia State

at Louisiana–Monroe

Louisiana–Lafayette

at Appalachian State

Idaho

at New Mexico State

Troy

Arkansas State

Coaching staff
On January 6, 2016, Everett Withers accepted the position of head coach at Texas State University. On July 18, 2016, Withers completed his staff for the 2016 season.

References

Texas State
Texas State Bobcats football seasons
Texas State Bobcats football